Jonas Olov Johansson (born 19 September 1995) is a Swedish professional ice hockey goaltender for the Colorado Eagles in the American Hockey League (AHL) while under contract to the Colorado Avalanche of the National Hockey League (NHL). Johansson was selected by the Buffalo Sabres in the third round, 61st overall, at the 2014 NHL Entry Draft. Along with Buffalo, Johansson has previously played with the Florida Panthers in the NHL and Brynäs IF of the Swedish Hockey League (SHL).

Playing career
Johansson won a silver medal with Team Sweden at the 2014 World Junior Ice Hockey Championships in a backup role, and he made his Swedish Hockey League debut playing with Brynäs IF during the 2013–14 SHL season.

On 31 May 2017, Johansson agreed to a three-year, entry-level contract with the Buffalo Sabres.

Johansson made his NHL debut on 4 February 2020, in relief of Carter Hutton in a game against the Colorado Avalanche. His first NHL start came on 6 February, making 18 saves on 21 shots in a shootout loss to the Detroit Red Wings. Johansson recorded his first NHL win on 23 February 2020, 2–1 against the Winnipeg Jets.

With the following North American season delayed due to the COVID-19 pandemic, on 31 October 2020, Johansson was loaned by the Sabres to German club, Krefeld Pinguine of the Deutsche Eishockey Liga (DEL), until the commencement of NHL training camp. Before joining Krefeld, the DEL was later delayed due to the pandemic and Johansson returned to the Sabres.

On 20 March 2021, Johansson was traded to the Colorado Avalanche in exchange for a sixth-round draft pick. The trade was delayed by a day as the Sabres waited to receive the results of several COVID-19 tests. Following the trade, Sabres beat writer John Vogl called Johansson the worst goaltender he had seen in nineteen years of covering the team. With the Avalanche, Johansson finished the regular season with a 5–1–1 record, including a win in their season finale against the Los Angeles Kings. He remained with the Avalanche through the playoffs without making an appearance, serving games as the backup while later among the black aces as the club's third choice goaltender.

On 29 June 2021, Johansson as a pending free agent opted to continue within the Avalanche organization, agreeing to a one-year, two-way contract extension. On 13 December, Johansson was claimed off waivers by the Florida Panthers.

As a free agent from the Panthers, Johansson opted to return to former club, the Colorado Avalanche, agreeing to a one-year, two-way contract on 13 July 2022. After attending training camp with the Avalanche, Johansson was placed on waivers during the pre-season. He was claimed the following day by divisional rival in the Arizona Coyotes on 30 September 2022. Johansson made one pre-season appearance with the Coyotes before he was injured and placed on the injured-reserve prior to being placed back on waivers on 11 October 2022. Johansson was re-claimed the following day off waivers by the Avalanche and re-assigned to join the Colorado Eagles to begin the 2022–23 season.

Career statistics

Regular season and playoffs

International

Awards and honors

References

External links

1995 births
Living people
Almtuna IS players
Brynäs IF players
Buffalo Sabres draft picks
Buffalo Sabres players
Charlotte Checkers (2010–) players
Cincinnati Cyclones (ECHL) players
Colorado Avalanche players
Colorado Eagles players
Florida Panthers players
People from Gävle
Rochester Americans players
Swedish ice hockey goaltenders
Sportspeople from Gävleborg County